Robert Edward Sheldon, Baron Sheldon PC (born Isaac Ezra Shamash; 13 September 1923 – 2 February 2020) was a British Labour Party politician and life peer who served as Member of Parliament (MP) for Ashton under Lyne from 1964 to 2001.

Early life and career
Isaac Ezra Shamash was born in Manchester to a family of Jewish immigrants from Iraq. His parents were Meir, a textile exporter, and Betty Shamash. He changed his name by deed poll in 1943. 

Sheldon was educated at Burnley Grammar School, trained in engineering at Burnley and Stockport technical colleges, and awarded an external degree from the University of London. He joined the Labour Party in 1945 and later served as a Manchester City Councillor. Sheldon worked as director of his family textile firm.

Political career
Sheldon first stood for Parliament in Manchester Withington at the 1959 general election and was elected as MP for Ashton under Lyne at the 1964 general election. 

Sheldon caused difficulty for the first Wilson government in his support for devaluation of the pound, which the Prime Minister and Chancellor strongly opposed. When Chancellor James Callaghan refused to answer his question on the issue in Parliament, there was a run on the pound. 

He was also staunchly pro-EU, supporting Britain's entry into the European Common Market and later advocating for membership of the European Monetary Union. Sheldon was known for his association with fellow MPs Joel Barnett and Edmund Dell, the three of whom met in Manchester during their youth.

He briefly served as Civil Service Minister after Labour returned to power in 1974 but was appointed as a Treasury Minister later in the same year. Sheldon was promoted to Financial Secretary to the Treasury from 1975 to 1979 and was made a Privy Counsellor in 1977. 

He served as Shadow Chief Secretary to the Treasury from 1981 until 1983, when he became Chair of the Public Accounts Committee (PAC). In his final term in the House of Commons, Sheldon stepped down from the PAC to chair both the Liaison Committee and Standards and Privileges Committee. 

He stood down from the Commons at the 2001 general election, and was created a life peer as Baron Sheldon, of Ashton-under-Lyne in the County of Greater Manchester, on 22 June 2001. Sheldon retired from the House of Lords on 18 May 2015.

Personal life 
Sheldon married his first cousin Eileen Shamash in 1945, with whom he had a son and daughter. Eileen died in 1969 and he married again to Mary Shield in 1971. His daughter, Gill Sargeant, later became a Labour Councillor on Barnet London Borough Council.

In 2000, he collapsed on the street of a heart attack and was resuscitated by a passer-by, who happened to be former Olympic swimmer Duncan Goodhew. He eventually died of a heart attack on 2 February 2020.

References

External links 
 Profile at Parliament of the United Kingdom
 
 Catalogue of the Sheldon papers held at LSE Archives

1923 births
2020 deaths
People educated at Burnley Grammar School
Labour Party (UK) MPs for English constituencies
Members of the Privy Council of the United Kingdom
Labour Party (UK) life peers
Councillors in Manchester
Alumni of the University of London
UK MPs 1964–1966
UK MPs 1966–1970
UK MPs 1970–1974
UK MPs 1974
UK MPs 1974–1979
UK MPs 1979–1983
UK MPs 1983–1987
UK MPs 1987–1992
UK MPs 1992–1997
UK MPs 1997–2001
Jewish British politicians
Members of the Parliament of the United Kingdom for Ashton-under-Lyne
Life peers created by Elizabeth II